Jörg Nobis (born 9 September 1975) is a German politician from Alternative for Germany who was his party's lead candidate in the 2022 Schleswig-Holstein state election. In the election he lost his seat.

Political career 
Nobis was a candidate in Segeberg – Stormarn-Mitte at the 2013 German federal election.

He was elected to the Landtag of Schleswig-Holstein in the 2017 Schleswig-Holstein state election.

References 

Living people
1975 births
21st-century German politicians
Alternative for Germany politicians
Members of the Landtag of Schleswig-Holstein